Balrampur district may refer to either of these districts of India:

 Balrampur district, Chhattisgarh
 Balrampur district, Uttar Pradesh

District name disambiguation pages